Ricardo Cabot Durán (born 7 February 1949 in Barcelona) is a former field hockey player from Spain, who won the silver medal with the Men's National Team at the 1980 Summer Olympics in Moscow. He competed in three consecutive Summer Olympics for Spain, starting in 1976.

References
Spanish Olympic Committee

External links
 

1949 births
Living people
Spanish male field hockey players
Olympic field hockey players of Spain
Olympic silver medalists for Spain
Field hockey players at the 1976 Summer Olympics
Field hockey players at the 1980 Summer Olympics
Field hockey players at the 1984 Summer Olympics
Field hockey players from Barcelona
Olympic medalists in field hockey
Medalists at the 1980 Summer Olympics